"New Looks From An Old Lover" is a song recorded by American country music artist B. J. Thomas. It was released in July 1983 as the second single from the album New Looks. "New Looks From An Old Lover" was B. J. Thomas' third number one on the country chart. The single went to number one for one week and spent a total of thirteen weeks on the country chart. It was Thomas' final number one hit on the U.S. charts. The song was written by Thomas' wife Gloria, along with Red Lane and Lathan Hudson.

The Single was distributed on a vinyl 7 inch, 45 rpm, phonograph record and is from the 1983 album New Looks, which hit number 13 on the Billboard Top Country Albums chart, released on vinyl LP and Cassette tape. The song was also released on several other albums from Thomas including: Wind Beneath My Wings in 1995 (compact disc and cassette tape), The Best of B.J. Thomas: New Looks and Old Fashioned Love in 2000 (compact disc) and as an acoustic arrangement in duet with Etta Britt on The Living Room Sessions in 2013 (compact disc and digital download).

Charts

Weekly charts

Year-end charts

References 

1983 singles
B. J. Thomas songs
Columbia Records singles
Songs written by Red Lane
1983 songs